Mahmoud Khalil (born 1 June 1991) is an Egyptian handball player for Zamalek SC (handball) and the Egyptian national team.

References

External links

1991 births
Living people
Egyptian male handball players
Expatriate handball players
Egyptian expatriates in Qatar
Handball players at the 2016 Summer Olympics
Olympic handball players of Egypt
21st-century Egyptian people